Jinna Mutune is a Kenyan film producer and director.

Biography
Mutune grew up in Nairobi, Kenya, in a middle-class family in Eastland's Kimathi Estate. She studied at the South African School of Motion Picture Medium and Live Performance and also studied film in the United States. After film school in South Africa, she went back to Kenya for a while and then moved to the U.S., living in Boston, Houston and California.  Mutune states that she knew she wanted to be a filmmaker at age sixteen and by that time had also been directing plays at church and at her school.

Mutune is the director of Leo, a story told through the eyes of a Maasai boy who wants to live out his dreams. Leo was her first feature film and it was also funded by her own production company, Pegg Entertainment, with cinematography by Abraham Martinez. Leo premiered in Nairobi in April 2011, but only to small venues: the film debuted on the "big screen" in Kenya in November 2012. The U.S. premiere of Leo was well received by Kenyans and Americans, and Mutune appeared on Kenya TV to discuss the film. Mutune also organized a business deal with the airlines Kenya Airways and Emirates, to show Leo in-flight. She also directed the film Chep, which was also produced by Pegg Entertainment. Chep, a movie about a female marathon runner, set in the 1970s and celebrating women and the men who support them, will be released in 2016. In addition to her feature films, she has also produced the music video for the Kenyan Official Olympic score (2012) and worked with Graça Machel on a public service announcement.

References

External links 
 Interview with Jinna Mutune (video)
 I Am African: Jinna Mutune (video)
 Jinna Mutune discusses 'Leo' (video)

Living people
Kenyan film producers
Kenyan women film directors
Year of birth missing (living people)
Place of birth missing (living people)